Ashey railway station is a station serving the village of Ashey on the Isle of Wight in England. It was on the line which ran from Ryde to Newport. It was resited during the BR era because of subsidence at the original site, it was also described in some timetables as Ashey for Nunwell.

History 

The station was opened by the Ryde and Newport Railway, which then amalgamated with other island railways to form the Isle of Wight Central Railway. Becoming part of the Southern Railway during the Grouping of 1923, the station passed to the Southern Region of British Railways on nationalisation in 1948. It was then closed by the British Railways Board, but was reopened by the Isle of Wight Steam Railway, a heritage railway, in 1993.

Ashey Racecourse railway station 

A branch ran from Ashey station to Ashey Quarry, and an additional station opened on this line by April 1884 to serve the adjacent race course. This station ceased operation around 1930.

Gallery

References

External links 

Ashey Station at Sub Brit
 Station on navigable 1946 O. S. map

Heritage railway stations on the Isle of Wight
Former Isle of Wight Central Railway stations
Railway stations in Great Britain opened in 1875
Railway stations in Great Britain closed in 1966
Railway stations in Great Britain opened in 1993
Beeching closures in England